The TSS Maunganui (later S/S Cyrenia) was a passenger vessel built by Fairfield Shipbuilding and Engineering Company, Govan for the Union Steamship Company of New Zealand and launched on 24 August 1911.

Career
Launched in 1911 to carry the Royal Mail and served on the San Francisco and Sydney runs.  She was employed as a troopship during World War I and World War II. She was sold to Cia Naviera del Atlantica, Piraeus in 1948 and renamed Cyrenia. She was sold in 1949 to Hellenic Mediterranean Lines and undertook service from Genoa and Piraeus to Fremantle, Melbourne and Sydney, carrying Greek, Italian and Jewish refugees and migrants.

Fate
On 1 November 1956 she left Melbourne for the last time, arriving in Savona, Italy, on 6 February 1957 for ship breaking.

Cultural legacy
In Greece the S/S Cyrenia is prominent due to Nikos Kavvadias' poem "The Seven Dwarves on the S/S Cyrenia and Thanos Mikroutsikos' song mentioning the ship. Kavvadias was the ship's radio operator.

Notes

External links 
 1912 photo

1911 ships
Ships built on the River Clyde
Troop ships
Passenger ships of New Zealand
World War I auxiliary ships of New Zealand
World War II auxiliary ships of New Zealand